Müslüm Can (born 22 June 1975 in West Berlin) is a retired Turkish footballer.

Can made a total of 29 2. Bundesliga appearances for Tennis Borussia Berlin before moving to Turkey where he played 139 games for various clubs in the Süper Lig.

References

External links 
 

1975 births
Living people
German people of Turkish descent
Footballers from Berlin
Turkish footballers
Association football midfielders
2. Bundesliga players
Süper Lig players
Füchse Berlin Reinickendorf players
Tennis Borussia Berlin players
Altay S.K. footballers
Samsunspor footballers
Kayserispor footballers
Orduspor footballers